The Looter is a fictional supervillain appearing in American comic books published by Marvel Comics. The character primarily appears in comic books featuring Spider-Man. The character first appeared in 1966.

Publication history
The character first appeared in The Amazing Spider-Man #36 (May 1966), and was created by Stan Lee and Steve Ditko.

The character subsequently appears in Marvel Team-Up #33-34 (May–June 1975), Defenders #63-64 (September–October 1978), Spectacular Spider-Man #41 (April 1980), Web of Spider-Man #39 (June 1988), The Amazing Spider-Man Annual #26 (1992), The Amazing Scarlet Spider #1 (November 1995), The Spectacular Scarlet Spider #1 (November 1995), Web of Scarlet Spider #2 (December 1995), The Sensational Spider-Man #8 (September 1996), Untold Tales of Spider-Man (October 1997), The Sensational Spider-Man #27 (May 1998), Marvel Knights: Spider-Man #6 (November 2004), Friendly Neighborhood Spider-Man #5 (April 2006), Spider-Man Family #7 (April 2008), The Amazing Spider-Man #645 (December 2010), The Superior Foes of Spider-Man #11 (2013) and The Amazing Spider-Man vol. 3, #9 (2015).

The Looter received an entry in the All-New Official Handbook of the Marvel Universe A-Z #6 (2006) #6.

Fictional character biography
Norton G. Fester was always a poor scientist, and was considered a crackpot by his colleagues. One day, however, he found an unusual meteor that crashed into the Earth. Excited by his discovery, Fester searched for funding into a project, but investors went for more commercial ventures. Fester decided to continue without funding, and while chiseling the meteor, he struck a pocket of gas. Immersed in the strange compound, he discovered that he now had super-strength and agility thanks to the meteor's powers. Fester decided to devote his time and new powers to crime from then on. Calling himself the Looter, he struck banks and offices everywhere, gaining his current name. However, after attempting to steal another meteor to continually supply himself with his powers, he was defeated by Spider-Man after a battle in a hot-air balloon.

Since then, the Looter has had no success whatsoever, even after a name change to the Meteor Man. He would come into conflict with Nighthawk after stealing a meteor from Kyle Richmond's home after he purchased it from the museum. Meteor Man would face Nighthawk and Spider-Man but would escape. Valkyrie from the Defenders helps Spider-Man apprehend Meteor Man. Fester tried to escape on his balloon but Valkyrie throws her sword into the balloon, causing it to pop. Meteor Man crashed into the ground and is hospitalized for a few months. He would reappear at the Empire State University campus to find components from a microwave energy exhibit to increase his powers. This would lead into another conflict with Spider-Man and Giant-Man. Fester created a transmitter that transmuted the energy in his meteors into microwaves which is then transmitted into his nervous system. However, his transmitter was channeling too much power and the feedback caused it to explode and Fester was presumed dead.

Fester survived the explosion, but his mind was further addled by his experiences and he became a homeless alcoholic. He robbed Nathan Lubensky, but was beaten down by Spider-Man and forced to surrender to the police, who try to help Nathan. He was again defeated by Spider-Man and later teamed up with Aura and Override. When Ben Reilly was acting as Spider-Man, Norton has stolen weapons used by various criminals in order to fund his research. He even stated that S.H.I.E.L.D. agents were after his work because of its importance. After Spider-Man beat Norton again - aided by Norton attempting to tie Spider-Man up with his own web-shooters, unaware that the webbing dissolved after an hour - S.H.I.E.L.D. agents arrived and took Norton away on board their helicarrier. When circumstances forced Spider-Man to adopt new identities, the Looter was the first foe Spider-Man fought as the Hornet when he attempted to raid the Daily Bugle in order to steal the ransom that Norman Osborn was offering for Spider-Man. Here he was portrayed as talking constantly to the original meteor after attaching it to a gun, despite Hornet's certainty that the rock was just a rock after giving him his strength. He was seen at an auction in which the Venom Symbiote was sold. He later attempted to steal yet another meteor, at a museum display, to grow further in power. Spider-Man defeated him once more in the museum bathroom, in front of a woman named Vanna Smith, who was obsessed with the wallcrawler.

During the Dark Reign storyline, Spider-Man would capture Looter after a robbery and web him up against a building wall. Norton tells Spider-Man that Norman Osborn is running the show and his stay in a jail cell wouldn't be too long. The wall crawler gets in Norton's face and gives him an ultimate wedgie before he leaves.

During the Origin of the Species storyline, Looter meets up with Screwball before he is attacked by Spider-Man (who is attacking and apprehending any villain that might be responsible for the abduction of Lily Hollister's baby). Looter pleads to Spider-Man that he never even touched Lily Hollister's baby.

The Looter is briefly seen being defeated by Spider-Man and his new sidekick Alpha.

Looter begins attending Supervillains Anonymous meetings that was held at a church and also attended by Boomerang, Doctor Bong, Grizzly, Hippo, Mirage, Porcupine II, and others. At another Supervillains Anonymous meeting, Looter and Grizzly tell about their violent run-ins with Superior Spider-Man (Doctor Octopus' mind in Spider-Man's body).

During the Spider-Verse storyline, Spider-Man and Silk run into Looter who has stolen a Spider-Tank and Spiderling outfits from Spider-Island II which was used as the base of the Superior Spider-Man (back when Doctor Octopus' mind was in Peter Parker's body). Spider-Man and Silk defeat Looter while his fleeing henchmen were defeated when Spider-UK, MC2 Spider-Girl, and Spider-Ham arrive.

During the Hunted storyline, Looter was seen as a patron at the Pop-Up with No Name.

Powers, abilities, and equipment
Fester received abnormal abilities from the meteor he discovered. The gases inside it provided him with extreme strength, stamina, durability, agility, and leaping. On one occasion, he was able to convert the radiation of certain meteors into microwave form. By drawing their energies onto himself, he grew in stature. As the Meteor Man, Fester has immense physical attributes. Compare to Captain America, he is much stronger than Spider-Man. 

The Looter has access to various types of equipment. He utilizes the "Dazzle Gun" (a gun that produces flashing, but blinding lights for quick getaways), a self-inflating helium balloon, and an upgraded stealth suit with bionics in its fabric to enhance his own powers even further.  Throughout his bizarre career, he wielded weapons from Stilt-Man, the Shocker, the Unicorn, the Trapster, and the Mauler.

Other versions

Spider-Man Loves Mary Jane
In Spider-Man Loves Mary Jane, Mary Jane's high school counselor Mr. Limke uses the identity of the Looter.

References

Characters created by Stan Lee
Characters created by Steve Ditko
Comics characters introduced in 1966
Fictional characters from New York City
Fictional characters with superhuman durability or invulnerability
Marvel Comics characters with superhuman strength
Marvel Comics giants
Marvel Comics mutates
Marvel Comics scientists
Marvel Comics supervillains
Spider-Man characters